Višňová is a municipality and village in Příbram District in the Central Bohemian Region of the Czech Republic. It has about 700 inhabitants.

In popular culture
Višňová is nationwide known for featuring in the TV series Chalupáři in the mid 1970s.

Notable people
Antonín Máša (1935–2001), film director and screenwriter

References

Villages in Příbram District